The Dean of Rochester is the head of the chapter of canons at Rochester Cathedral, the mother church of the Church of England Diocese of Rochester. The current dean is Philip Hesketh, who has served in that role since June 2016.

List of deans

Early modern
1541–1570 Walter Phillips
1570–1572 Edmund Freke
1572–1581 Thomas Willoughby
1581–1591 John Coldwell
1592–1611 Thomas Blague
1611–1615 Richard Milbourne
1615–1620 Robert Scott (elder)
1621–1624 Godfrey Goodman
1625–1639 Walter Balcanquhall
1639–1642 Henry King
1642–1644 Thomas Turner
1644–1660 Vacancy (Commonwealth)
1660 Benjamin Lany
1661–1670 Nathaniel Hardy
1670–1673 Peter Mews
1673–1688 Thomas Lamplugh
1676–1688 John Castilion
1688 Simon Lowth (nominated)
1689–1706 Henry Ullock
1706–1723 Samuel Pratt
1724–1732 Nicholas Clagett
1732–1743 Thomas Herring
1743–1744 William Barnard
1744–1765 John Newcombe
1765–1767 William Markham

1767–1775 Benjamin Newcombe
1775–1779 Thomas Thurlow
1779–1782 Richard Cust
1782–1802 Thomas Dampier

Late modern
1802–1808 Samuel Goodenough
1808–1820 William Busby
1820–1870 Robert Stevens
1870–1870 Thomas Dale
1870–1887 Robert Scott (younger)
1887–1904 Samuel Hole
1904–1913 Ernald Lane
1913–1928 John Storrs
1928–1932 Reginald Talbot
1932–1937 Francis Underhill
1937–1943 Ernest Blackie
1943–1958 Thomas Crick
1959–1966 Robert Stannard
1966–1977 Stanley Betts
1978–1989 John Arnold
1989–2003 Edward Shotter
2003–2005 Jonathan Meyrick (Acting)
2005–2011 Adrian Newman
2011–2012 Philip Hesketh (Acting)
2012–25 January 2015 (res.): Mark Beach
25 January 2015 – 16 June 2016: Philip Hesketh (Acting)
16 June 2016–present: Philip Hesketh

Sources
British History Online – Fasti Ecclesiae Anglicanae 1541–1857 – Deans of Rochester
The Archives of the Dean and Chapter of Rochester, 1541-1907

References

 
Diocese of Rochester
Deans of Rochester
Kent-related lists
Dean of Rochester